The 1994–95 Liga Artzit season saw Maccabi Jaffa and Hapoel Kfar Saba promoted to Liga Leumit, whilst Hapoel Ashkelon and Hapoel Lod were relegated to Liga Alef.

Final table

References

Liga Artzit seasons
Israel
2